Gohar Shah (born 4 April 1995) is a Pakistani cricketer. He made his first-class debut for National Bank of Pakistan in the 2016–17 Quaid-e-Azam Trophy on 12 November 2016. Gohar took his first wicket on 28 November 2016 when he dismissed Hammad Azam in a Super Eight game in the Quaid-e-Azam Trophy against United Bank Limited.

References

External links
 

1995 births
Living people
Pakistani cricketers
National Bank of Pakistan cricketers
Cricketers from Lahore